The Petersberg Railway, or Petersbergbahn, was a rack railway line in the North Rhine-Westphalia region of Germany. The line ran from Königswinter to the summit of the Petersberg mountain, and was built to serve the Hotel Petersberg there. The line opened in 1889 and closed in 1958.

From 1913, the Petersberg Railway was under the same ownership as the nearby Drachenfels Railway, which is still in service. Although never physically connected, the two railways used the same track gauge and rack equipment, and rolling stock was transferred between the two lines.

References

External links 

Mountain railways
Metre gauge railways in Germany
Private railway companies of Germany
Königswinter
Railway lines in North Rhine-Westphalia
Rack railways in Germany
Railway lines opened in 1889
Railway lines closed in 1958
Petersberg (Siebengebirge)